Theotonious Amal Ganguly, CSC, (18 January 1920, in Hashnabad, Bangladesh – 2 September 1977) was Archbishop of the Archdiocese of Dhaka from 1967 until his death on 2 September 1977. Archbishop Ganguly was a religious of the Congregation of Holy Cross.

Career

The local bishop sent him to the major seminary, called St. Albert's Seminary, run by the Jesuit Fathers at Ranchi of Bihar State, India. As usual, he was liked and appreciated by both the professors and seminarians for his studies and humble behaviour.

He successfully completed two years of philosophy and four years of theology studies at the seminary and, on 6 June 1946, was ordained a diocesan priest at St. Mary's Cathedral, Ranchi, by Jesuit Bishop Oscar Sevrin.

In 1947, newly consecrated Bishop Lawrence Leo Graner of the Diocese of Dhaka, sent Ganguly to the University of Notre Dame, Indiana, for higher studies in philosophy. He completed an M.A. in philosophy and then, in 1951, received his Ph.D. degree in philosophy with his doctoral dissertation on Purush and Prakriti (Self and Nature): A Philosophical Appraisal of Patanjali – Samkhya – Yoga. (Patañjali was an ancient Hindu philosopher promoting yoga for inner contemplation, born in India in about 250 B.C.)

While at Notre Dame, Ganguly expressed interest in joining the Congregation of Holy Cross. Sent to the novitiate in Jordan, Minnesota, in 1951, he made his religious profession on 16 August 1952 before returning to Dhaka in October of that year.

Appointed a professor of logic and English at Notre Dame College, founded by Holy Cross in Dhaka in 1949, he became the dean of studies in 1954, and, in 1958, he was appointed vice principal of the college. After James L. Martin died suddenly in 1960, Ganguly succeeded him as the principal.

In 1960, Ganguly was consecrated a bishop and Titular Bishop of Oliva as well as the Auxiliary Bishop of the Archdiocese of Dhaka. Five years later he was appointed Titular Archbishop of Drizipara and the Coadjutor Archbishop of Dhaka. In November 1967, he became the Metropolitan Archbishop of Dhaka.

He was also the President of Pakistan Catholic Bishops’ Conference (PCBC,1971–1973) and President of the Catholic Bishops’ Conference of Bangladesh (CBCB, 1973–1977).

Death and canonization process 
He died suddenly on 2 September 1977 of a heart attack.

Archbishop Ganguly's canonization process started in 2006. Archbishop Paulinus Costa of Dhaka, on 2 September of that year, in an official ceremony at St. Mary's Cathedral in Dhaka, introduced the causes and opened the diocesan inquiry on Archbishop Theotonius Amal Ganguly, CSC. The process of his canonization is at the first stage known as "Servant of God".

See also
 Christianity in Bangladesh
 Roman Catholicism in Bangladesh

References

External links
 Biography of Ganguly at catholic-hierarchy.org 
 Biography of Ganguly at holycrosscongregation.org
 Biography of Ganguly at gcatholic.org

1920 births
1977 deaths
Roman Catholic archbishops of Dhaka
Congregation of Holy Cross bishops
University of Notre Dame alumni
Servants of God
20th-century Roman Catholic archbishops in Bangladesh
Academic staff of Notre Dame College, Dhaka
Bangladeshi Roman Catholic bishops